Secondary poisoning, or relay toxicity, is the poisoning that results when one organism comes into contact with or ingests another organism that has poison in its system.  It typically occurs when a predator eats an animal, such as a mouse, rat, or insect, that has previously been poisoned by a commercial pesticide. If the level of toxicity in the prey animal is sufficiently high, it will harm the predator.

Mammals susceptible to secondary poisoning include humans, pets such as cats and dogs, as well as wild birds.

Pesticides 
Various pesticides such as rodenticides may cause secondary poisoning.  Some pesticides require multiple feedings spanning several days; this increases the time a target organism continues to move after ingestion, raising the risk of secondary poisoning of a predator.
Most of slow-acting poisons for pests have cumulative effects and so can cause secondary poisoning and environment pollution.

References

Toxicology